House of Ruth, founded in 1976 and opened on November 21, 1977, is a non-profit organization that serves more than 600 women and children who are abused and homeless in Washington, DC.

The mission of House of Ruth is to help women, children and families in greatest need and with very limited resources build safe, stable lives and achieve their highest potential.

At 13 locations in Washington, D.C., House of Ruth serves women, children, and families who are striving to overcome childhood trauma, domestic violence, homelessness, mental health disorders, and substance abuse.  House of Ruth provides nurturing, structured, safe housing and caring, consistent, individualized services in order to capitalize on the participants' strengths and meet their specific needs.

Programs
House of Ruth concentrates their services on three program areas:  
  Housing and Services for Women, including service-enriched transitional and permanent housing at five locations for 109 women;
  Housing and Services for Families, including service-enriched housing at five locations for 63 families as well as supportive services for 11 families housed in apartments throughout the city; and
  Community-Based Services, including Kidspace, providing therapeutic child development to 76 children up to five years old who are homeless or at risk and supportive services for their parents, and the Domestic Violence Support Center, a counseling center to address domestic violence, serving roughly 200 women at any given time and more than 400 over the course of the year.

References

External links
 House of Ruth website
The Houses of Ruth

Women's shelters in the United States
Organizations established in 1976
1976 establishments in Washington, D.C.
Women in Washington, D.C.
Non-profit organizations based in Washington, D.C.